William Oliver Fitzalen Howard (born 13 February 1981) is an English former first-class cricketer.

Howard was born at Guildford and was educated at Cranleigh School, before going up to Oxford Brookes University. While studying at Oxford Brookes, he played first-class cricket for Oxford MCCU from 2002–04, making five appearances. Playing as a wicket-keeper, he scored 131 runs in his five matches at an average of 21.83 and a high score of 72, his only first-class half century. 

After trials with Sussex and Leicestershire, Howard founded a theatre ticketing business. In 2008, he toured Uganda with a Marylebone Cricket Club team captained by Jamie Dalrymple in 2008, playing minor matches against the Uganda national cricket team.

Notes and references

External links

1981 births
Living people
People from Guildford
People educated at Cranleigh School
Alumni of Oxford Brookes University
English cricketers
Oxford MCCU cricketers